General elections were held in Honduras on 28 November 2021. Among the positions being contested was the President of Honduras, head of state and head of government of Honduras, to replace Juan Orlando Hernández from the National Party.

Following the election, Nasry Asfura of the National Party and Xiomara Castro of Libre both declared victory as votes were being counted. On 30 November 2021, Asfura and the National Party conceded to Castro. Castro's win made her the first female president-elect of Honduras, the person with the most vote in the history of Honduras, and ended 12 years of conservative National Party rule.

Background
Incumbent president Juan Orlando Hernández was first elected in 2013 after defeating Xiomara Castro, and re-elected in 2017 after orchestrating an amendment to Constitution of Honduras to allow for his reelection. There were large protests against Hernandez following the 2017 elections.

Electoral system
The President of Honduras is elected by plurality, with the candidate receiving the most votes in a single round of voting declared the winner. The 128 members of the National Congress are elected by open list proportional representation from 18 multi-member constituencies based on the departments ranging in size from one to 23 seats. Seats are allocated using the Hare quota.

Primary elections
Party primaries were held on 14 March 2021 to elect which candidates would represent each party.

Candidates

Nasry Asfura 
Nasry Asfura is the current mayor of Honduras's capital, Tegucigalpa, and a member of the ruling right-wing National Party of Honduras. During the campaign, Asfura distanced himself from former President Juan Orlando Hernandez's alleged involvement within drug trafficking schemes engaged by his brother. Asfura is known by his supporters as "Papi a la orden" or "Daddy at your service." 

Asfura prioritized upgrades to infrastructure and job creation. In addition, Asfura pledged support towards the business, health, education, and manufacturing sectors.

Xiomara Castro 
Xiomara Castro, the First Lady of Honduras from 2006 to 2009, was the presidential candidate for the left-wing Liberty and Refoundation (Libre) party in the 2013 general election, finishing in second place. She founded the party with her husband Manuel Zelaya after he was deposed in the 2009 Honduran coup d'état.

Her thirty-point campaign platform includes a referendum on a new constitution, the establishment of diplomatic relations with the People's Republic of China, the creation of a UN-backed anti-corruption commission modeled on the International Commission against Impunity in Guatemala (CICIG) and advancing women's rights. On economic issues, she opposes the ZEDES semi-autonomous free trade zones promoted by Juan Orlando Hernández and supports social programs to fight poverty while maintaining good relations with the private sector. She also proposes the reform of the Security, Defense, Coalition, and Secrecy Laws.

Yani Rosenthal 
Yani Rosenthal is a longtime member of the centrist Liberal Party of Honduras. He is a businessman and was sentenced to three years in a US prison for laundering drug money, being released in 2020 just in time to begin his presidential campaign.

Withdrawn candidates
Milton Benítez, independent candidate who withdrew to support Xiomara Castro
Salvador Nasralla, a candidate in 2013 and 2017, was planning to run as the candidate of the Savior Party of Honduras, but withdrew from the election on 13 October to become Castro's running mate.
Santos Rodriguez Orellana, independent candidate who was arrested under drug trafficking and homicide charges.

Opinion polls

Results
Both Asfura and Castro declared victory on election night as votes continued to be counted. On 30 November 2021, Asfura's National Party conceded defeat to Castro. Asfura announced in a statement that he met with Castro and her family to congratulate her win.

Castro's victory marked the end of 12 years of National Party control of the presidency, following the constitutional crisis and the subsequent coup d'état that ousted Castro's husband in 2009. Castro is the first female president of Honduras.

President

National Congress

Parlacen

Reactions

International
 Organization of American States: the head of the Electoral Observation Mission of the OAS, Luis Guillermo Solís, remarked the responsibility with which Hondurans voted in an "atmosphere of peace and civility" and that the three majority political forces of the country contributed to celebrate "a peaceful election day". Even so, he regretted that an agreement was not reached to reform the electoral law and that the deficiencies detected must be improved. 
: The Government of Canada congratulated Castro for being the first woman President-elect. Canada states that they are looking forward to work with Castro on several priorities, particularly democracy, inclusivity, abortion, and reducing corruption.
:  The President of Nicaragua Daniel Ortega and his  Vice President Rosario Murillo congratulated among the first the candidate Xiomara Castro through an official statement published on 29 November 2021, stating: "Dear Xiomara, Dear Brothers: We salute with much respect and appreciation the progress towards the electoral triumph in Dear Honduras, where that Brother People lives the hope of better times. ... In our closeness and good neighborhood, we continue determined to advance creating the future.".
: The Government of Spain congratulated Xiomara Castro on her victory, which is "symbolising the achievements in the struggle for the equality of Honduran women". He also praised Castro's message of "reconciliation, peace and justice" in her victory speech and the Honduran people for a "smooth" election.
: United States Secretary of State Antony Blinken congratulated Castro on her win following Asfura's concession. In a statement, he expressed congratulations to Castro for becoming the first female president of Honduras.
: President Nicolás Maduro expressed through Twitter his congratulations to Castro for her "historic victory".

National
 David Chávez, President of the National Party of Honduras announced that the party will contribute to a constructive opposition and that they were ready to work with the new government.

References

Honduras
General election
Presidential elections in Honduras
Election and referendum articles with incomplete results